Borbás is a Hungarian surname. Notable people with the surname include:

Gáspár Borbás (1884–1976), Hungarian footballer
Rita Borbás (born 1980), Hungarian handball player
Vinczé von Borbás (1844–1905), Hungarian botanist

Hungarian-language surnames